is a railway station in Nishiwaki, Hyōgo Prefecture, Japan, operated by West Japan Railway Company (JR West).

Lines
Funamachiguchi Station is served by the Kakogawa Line.

See also
 List of railway stations in Japan

External links
  

Railway stations in Hyōgo Prefecture
Railway stations in Japan opened in 1924